To Noora with Love is a 2014 Malayalam romantic film directed by Babu Narayanan and produced by Muhammed Ansar. Mamta Mohandas, Krish J. Sathaar, Kanika and Archana Kavi play the lead roles in the film. Filming started in January 2014.

Plot
The movie revolves around a Muslim couple Noorjahan aka Noora and Shahjahan. The movie begins showing Noora in the hospital for delivery. It seems that she is having some complications. Depressed Shahjahan goes away from the hospital just only to meet with an accident hitting his head to a stone. The movie takes a flashback. Noorjahan is a social activist, who also wins 1 crore rupees from the game show Crorepati to offer it to the orphanage. And Shahjahan is a Sufi singer. She uses "Phone-a-Friend" lifeline, and calls Shahjahan to help her answer the last question which was based on Sufi singers, to which he gives her the correct answer. Soon it is telecasted on the TV. From that day onwards Shahjahan tries to meet Noora whom he has never met. Finally she falls in love and proposes Shahjahan in a public mall for marriage. In the wedding ceremony of Dr. Sreeparvathi Noora's close and childhood friend Shahjahan kisses Noora to teach her a lesson for insulting him in public, in front of everyone to which all blame Noora for this. Shahjahan regrets and asks Noora to forgive and finally both get married with a lot of celebrations. One day Noora and her friends along with their husbands go on an outing and while Noora and Shahjahan are boating Noora faints and falls into water it is revealed that she is pregnant. After some days blood comes out of Noora's nose. But Dr. Sajan Varghese tells the couple to abort the child as Noora was suffering from dilated cardiomyopathy causing her heart to work slowly which may create complications during the delivery and even death. But the couple decide to continue with her pregnancy and leaves the rest in God's hands. Finally the delivery date comes and Noora is admitted to the hospital. The whole town prays for Noora as she was good activist. Now the movie comes back to Shahjahan's accident. Shahjahan has got severe head injury. By God's grace Noora and her baby are out of danger. Both Shahjahan and Noora are in the same ICU room. And seeing Shahjahan injured her health becomes critical. The doctor advises the family to get a heart donor as Noora's heart has to be transplanted immediately within 48 hours. Finally a donor is found and Noora is alright. When the media asks the doctors about the donor's name Dr. Varghese replies that he is a man who loved Noora and touched her heart who comes out to be Brother James.

Cast

 Mamta Mohandas as Noorjahan aka Noora
 Krish J. Sathaar as Shajahan
 Kanika as Sainaba, Shahjahan's only sister
 Archana Kavi as Dr.Sreeparvathi
 Nedumudi Venu as Dr.Sajan Varghese
 Ambika as Noora's mother
 Ramesh Pisharody as Brother James
 Sreedevi Unni
 Biyon
 Munna
 Madhupal
 Mamukkoya
 Kozhikode Narayanan Nair
 Niyas Backer
 Kannur Sreelatha
 Anees Oscario
 Mukesh as Special Appearance in the game show

Soundtrack
The music was composed by Mohan Sithara, with lyrics written by Sarath Vayalar.

References 

2010s Malayalam-language films
2014 films
Films directed by Babu Narayanan
Films scored by Mohan Sithara